This article is about the particular significance of the decade 1830–1839 to Wales and its people.

Incumbents
Prince of Wales - vacant
Princess of Wales - vacant

Events
1830
1831
1832
1833
1834
1835
1836
1837
1838
1839

Arts and literature

New books
Charles James Apperley - The Chace, the Road, and the Turf (1837)
Eliza Constantia Campbell - Tales about Wales (1837)
John Evans (I. D. Ffraid) - Hanes yr Iddewon (1831)
Y Fwyalchen (poetry anthology) (1835)
Felicia Hemans - Songs of the Affections (1830)
Benjamin Jones (PA Môn) - Athrawiaeth Bedydd (1830)
Sir Samuel Rush Meyrick - Engraved Illustrations of Antient Arms and Armour, from the Collection at Goodrich Court (1830)
Thomas Price (Carnhuanawc) - Hanes Cymru a Chenedl y Cymry o'r Cynoesoedd hyd at Farwolaeth Llywelyn ap Gruffydd, vol. 1 (1836)
William Williams (Caledfryn) - Drych Barddonol (1839)

Music
Thomas Griffiths (Tau Gimel) - Casgliad o Hymnau (1830)
David James - Myfyrdawd (1833)

Births
1830
23 January - Thomas Lloyd-Mostyn, politician (d. 1861)
22 April - Sarah Emily Davies, educator (d. 1921)
May - Richard Davies (Tafolog), poet and critic (d. 1904)
25 May - Robert Williams (Trebor Mai), poet (d. 1877)
1831
20 December - William T. Davies, Governor of Pennsylvania (d. 1912)
1832
5 January - Love Jones-Parry, politician and Patagonian settler (d. 1891)
3 April - William Thomas (Islwyn), poet (d. 1878)
25 September - John Ceiriog Hughes, poet (d. 1887)
1833
date unknown
Richard Davies (Mynyddog), poet (d. 1877)
James James, harpist and composer (d. 1902)
1834
16 October - Pryce Pryce-Jones, mail order entrepreneur (d. 1920)
date unknown - William Thomas (Gwilym Marles), minister (d. 1879)
1836
30 January - Lewis Jones, Patagonian settler (d. 1904)
5 July - Evan Herber Evans, minister (d. 1896)
30 September - George Douglas-Pennant, 2nd Baron Penrhyn, industrialist (d. 1907)
6 October - Allen Raine, novelist (d. 1908)
20 October - Daniel Owen, novelist (d. 1895)
date unknown - John Jones (Myrddin Fardd), poet (d. 1921)
1837
5 August - William Lewis, 1st Baron Merthyr, industrialist (d. 1914)
6 September - Henry Thomas Edwards, preacher (d. 1884)
22 September - Thomas Charles Edwards, minister, writer and first principal of the University of Wales (d. 1900)
26 December - Sir William Boyd Dawkins, geologist (d. 1929)
date unknown - William Bowen Rowlands, politician (d. 1906)
1838
date unknown - Charles Gresford Edmondes, clergyman and teacher (d. 1893)
1839
7 March - Ludwig Mond, German-born industrialist (d. 1909)
24 September - John Neale Dalton, royal chaplain and tutor (d. 1931)
date unknown - Sarah Jane Rees (Cranogwen), writer (d. 1916)

Deaths
1830
26 June - King George IV of the United Kingdom, formerly the second longest-serving Prince of Wales (1762-1820)
1831
7 January - Edward "Celtic" Davies, author, 74
8 June - Sarah Siddons, actress (born 1755)
13 August - Dic Penderyn, labourer (executed) (born 1808) 
1834
11 August - William Crawshay I, industrialist (b. 1764)
2 September - David Charles, hymn-writer (b. 1762)
1835
13 May - John Nash, architect (b. 1752)
3 June - William Owen Pughe, grammarian and lexicographer (b. 1759) 
date unknown - Robert Davies (Robin Ddu o'r Glyn), poet (b. 1769)
1836
22 November - Peter Bailey Williams, antiquarian (b. 1763)
1837
19 February - Thomas Burgess, Bishop of St David's, 80
1838
14 March - Wyndham Lewis, MP, 57
19 July - Christmas Evans, preacher (b. 1766)
26 December - Ann Hatton, novelist (b. 1764)
1839
16 May - Edward Clive, 1st Earl of Powis

 
19th century in Wales
Wales
Decades in Wales